North Belleville is an unincorporated community in Hendricks County, Indiana, in the United States. It lies north of Belleville, hence the name.

References

Unincorporated communities in Hendricks County, Indiana
Unincorporated communities in Indiana